The President of the University of Maryland, College Park manages the day-to-day operations of the University of Maryland, College Park.  The president is expected to work cooperatively with the University Senate and the University System of Maryland Board of Regents to effectively manage the university.

List of Presidents of the University of Maryland

Presidents of the Maryland Agricultural College and Maryland State College

The school was known as the Maryland Agricultural College from its founding until the state of Maryland assumed control of the university in 1916. It was then renamed the Maryland State College.
 Benjamin Hallowell (1859) 
 Charles Benedict Calvert (acting, 1859 – 1860)
 John Work Scott (1860)
 John M. Colby (1860 – 1861)
 Henry Onderdonk (1861 – 1864)
 Nicholas Worthington (acting, 1864 – 1867)
 George Washington Custis Lee (1866)
 Charles Minor (1867 – 1868)
 Franklin Buchanan (1868 – 1869)
 Samuel Register (1869 – 1873)
 Samuel Jones (1873 – 1875)
 William H. Parker (1875 – 1882)
 Augustine Smith (1883 – 1887)
 Allen Dodge (acting, 1887 – 1888)
 Henry Alvord (1888 – 1892)
 Richard W. Silvester (1892 – 1912)
 Thomas A. Spence (acting, 1912 – 1913)
 Harry J. Patterson (1913 – 1917)
 Albert F. Woods (1917 – 1926)

Presidents of the University of Maryland
The name of the school was changed to the University of Maryland in 1926.
 Raymond Pearson (1926 – 1935) 
 Harry Clifton "Curley" Byrd (1935 – 1954)
 Thomas B. Symons (acting, 1954)
 Wilson Homer "Bull" Elkins* (1954 – 1970)

Elkins served as President of 5 campus University of Maryland network from 1970-1978.

Chancellors of the University of Maryland
Following the departure of Wilson Homer Elkins, the Chancellor assumed the responsibilities of the President.
 Charles E. Bishop (1970 – 1974) 
 John W. Dorsey (acting, 1974 – 1975)
 Robert Gluckstern (1975 – 1982)
 William Kirwan (acting, 1982)
 John B. Slaughter (1982 – 1988)

Presidents of the University of Maryland

In 1989, the office of the President was re-established following the re-organization of the public schools of Maryland under the new University System of Maryland.
 William Kirwan (1989 – 1998)
 Gregory L. Geoffroy (acting, 1998) 
 C. Daniel Mote Jr. (1998 – 2010)
 Nariman Farvardin (acting, 2010)
 Wallace Loh (2010 – 2020)
 Darryll J. Pines (2020 – present)

References

List of Presidents of the University of Maryland
University of Maryland, College Park Presidents

 
University of Maryland, College Park
University of Maryland, College Park
Maryland, College Park